Skjærgårdsflirt (Skerry Flirtation) is a Norwegian comedy film from 1932 directed by Rasmus Breistein. It is based on a play of the same name by Gideon Wahlberg. The film is considered lost.

Cast
 Else Bull as Inga Sjøholm, Sjøholm's daughter
 Kristian Hefte as Erik Østerman, Østerman's son
 Finn Bernhoft as Andersen, a wholesaler
 Bjørn Bjørnevik as Sjøholm, a farmer
 Arne Kleve as Østerman, a fisherman
 Vilhelm Lund as Hans, Andersen's nephew
 Birger Løvaas as Karl Anton, a servant boy at the Østerman house
 Lisbeth Nyborg as Augusta Østerman
 Astrid Schwab as Lily Andersen, Andersen's daughter
 Olga Sjøgren as Katrine, a servant girl at the Østerman house

References

External links
 
 Skjærgårdsflirt at the National Library of Norway
 Skjærgårdsflirt at Filmfront

1932 films
Norwegian black-and-white films
Norwegian comedy films
1932 comedy films
1930s Norwegian-language films
Films directed by Rasmus Breistein